Thisizima bubalopa is a moth of the family Tineidae. It is found in Sri Lanka and India.

References

Moths described in 1911
Tineidae